James Gregoire (born 1974) is an American politician. He serves as a Republican member for the Franklin-6 district of the Vermont House of Representatives.

Life and career 
Gregoire was born in St. Albans, Vermont. He attended Fairfield Center School and Bellows Free Academy.

Gregoire served in the United States Army for five years, and was formerly in the Vermont National Guard.

In 2019, Gregoire was elected to represent the Franklin-6 district of the Vermont House of Representatives, succeeding Daniel Connor. He defeated Kelly Cummings in the general election.

References 

1974 births
Living people
People from St. Albans, Vermont
Republican Party members of the Vermont House of  Representatives
21st-century American politicians